The following were the events of Volleyball for the year 2016 throughout the world.

Beach volleyball

2016 Summer Olympics (FIVB–BVB)
 August 6 – 18: 2016 Summer Olympics for Men and Women in  Rio de Janeiro at Copacabana Beach
 Men: 
   (Alison Cerutti & Bruno Oscar Schmidt)
   (Daniele Lupo & Paolo Nicolai)
   (Alexander Brouwer & Robert Meeuwsen)
 Women:
   (Laura Ludwig & Kira Walkenhorst)
   (Ágatha Bednarczuk & Bárbara Seixas)
   (April Ross & Kerri Walsh Jennings)

International beach volleyball championships
 May 11 – 16: 2016 FIVB Beach Volleyball U21 World Championships in  Lucerne
 Men:  George Souto Maior Wanderley / Arthur Diego Mariano Lanci
 Women:  Eduarda Santos Lisboa / Ana Patricia Silva Ramos
 July 6 – 10: 2016 FIVB World Continental Cup Olympic Qualification in  Sochi
 Men: Both  and  qualified to compete at Rio 2016.
 July 26 – 31: 2016 FIVB Beach Volleyball U19 World Championships in  Larnaca
 Men:  Renato Andrew Lima de Carvalho / Rafael José Mendonça de Queiroz
 Women:  Eduarda Santos Lisboa / Victoria Lopes Pereira Tosta
 September 13 – 18: 2016 FIVB World Tour Finals in  Toronto
 Men:  Alison Cerutti / Bruno Oscar Schmidt
 Women:  Laura Ludwig / Kira Walkenhorst

BV Grand Slam
 March 8 – 13: Grand Slam #1 in  Rio de Janeiro
 Men:  Bartosz Losiak / Piotr Kantor
 Women:  Kerri Walsh Jennings / April Ross
 May 24 – 29: Grand Slam #2 in  Moscow
 Men:  Reinder Nummerdor / Christiaan Varenhorst
 Women:  Kerri Walsh Jennings / April Ross
 June 14 – 19: Grand Slam #3 in  Olsztyn
 Men:  Aleksandrs Samoilovs / Jānis Šmēdiņš
 Women:  Laura Ludwig / Kira Walkenhorst
 August 23 – 28: Grand Slam #4 (final) in  Long Beach, California
 Men:  Pedro Solberg Salgado / Evandro Oliveira
 Women:  Kerri Walsh Jennings / April Ross

BV Major
 June 7 – 12: Major #1 in  Hamburg
 Men:   Nicholas Lucena / Phil Dalhausser
 Women:  Laura Ludwig / Kira Walkenhorst
 June 28 – July 3: Major #2 in  Poreč
 Men:  Alison Cerutti / Bruno Oscar Schmidt
 Women:  Julia Sude / Chantal Laboureur
 July 5 – 10: Major #3 in  Gstaad
 Men:  Pedro Solberg Salgado / Evandro Gonçalves Oliveira Júnior
 Women:  Larissa França / Talita Antunes
 July 26 – 31: Major #4 (final) in  Klagenfurt
 Men:  Aleksandrs Samoilovs / Jānis Šmēdiņš
 Women:  Laura Ludwig / Kira Walkenhorst

BV Open
 February 15 – 19: Open #1 in  Kish Island (men only)
 Winners:  Jefferson Santos Pereira / Cherif Younousse
 February 23 – 28: Open #2 in  Maceió
 Men:  Phil Dalhausser / Nicholas Lucena
 Women:  Eduarda Santos Lisboa / Elize Secomandi Maia
 March 15 – 20: Open #3 in  Vitória, Espírito Santo
 Men:  Alison Cerutti / Bruno Oscar Schmidt
 Women:  Larissa França / Talita Antunes
 April 5 – 8: Open #4 in  Doha (men only)
 Winners:  Alex Ranghieri / Adrian Ignacio Carambula Raurich
 April 12 – 17: Open #5 in  Xiamen
 Men:  Pablo Herrera / Adrián Gavira
 Women:  Isabelle Forrer / Anouk Vergé-Dépré
 April 19 – 24: Open #6 in  Fuzhou
 Men:  Phil Dalhausser / Nicholas Lucena
 Women:  Kerri Walsh Jennings / April Ross
 April 26 – May 1: Open #7 in  Fortaleza
 Men:  Oscar Brandão / Andre Loyola Stein
 Women:  Elize Secomandi Maia / Eduarda Santos Lisboa
 May 3 – 8: Open #8 in  Sochi
 Men:  Paolo Nicolai / Daniele Lupo
 Women:  Joana Heidrich / Nadine Zumkehr
 May 10 – 15: Open #9 in  Antalya
 Men:  Aleksandrs Samoilovs / Jānis Šmēdiņš
 Women:  Laura Ludwig / Kira Walkenhorst
 May 17 – 21: Open #10 (final) in  Cincinnati
 Men:  Gustavo Albrecht Carvalhaes / Saymon Barbosa Santos
 Women:  Kerri Walsh Jennings / April Ross

Volleyball

2016 Summer Olympics (FIVB–VB)
 August 6 – 20: 2016 Summer Olympics (Women) in  Rio de Janeiro (at the Ginásio do Maracanãzinho)
  ;  ;  
 August 7 – 21: 2016 Summer Olympics (Men) in  Rio de Janeiro (at the Ginásio do Maracanãzinho)
  ;  ;

International volleyball events
 January 4 – 9: 2016 European Women's Continental Olympic Qualification in  Ankara
  has qualified to compete at Rio 2016.
  and  has qualified to compete at FIVB World Qualification Tournament.
 January 5 – 10: 2016 European Men's Continental Olympic Qualification in  Berlin
  has qualified to compete at Rio 2016.
  and  has qualified to compete at FIVB World Qualification Tournament.
 January 6 – 10: 2016 CSV Women's South American Olympic Qualification in  Bariloche
  has qualified to compete at Rio 2016.
  has qualified to compete at FIVB World Qualification Tournament.
  has qualified to compete at FIVB Intercontinental Qualification Tournament.
 January 7 – 9: 2016 NORCECA Women's Continental Olympic Qualification at Pinnacle Bank Arena in  Lincoln, Nebraska
 The  has qualified to compete at Rio 2016.
  has qualified to compete at FIVB World Qualification Tournament.
  has qualified to compete at FIVB Intercontinental Qualification Tournament.
 January 7 – 14: 2016 African Men's Continental Olympic Qualification in  Brazzaville
  has qualified to compete at Rio 2016.
  and  has qualified to compete at FIVB Intercontinental Qualification Tournament.
 January 8 – 10: 2016 NORCECA Men's Continental Olympic Qualification in  Edmonton
  has qualified to compete at Rio 2016.
  has qualified to compete at FIVB World Qualification Tournament.
  has qualified to compete at FIVB Intercontinental Qualification Tournament.
 February 12 – 16: 2016 African Women's Continental Olympic Qualification in  Yaoundé
  has qualified to compete at Rio 2016.
 March 23 – April 1: 2016 Men's African Club Championship in  Cairo
  El Geish defeated  Espérance, 3–1 in matches won, to win their first Men's African Club Championship title.  Smouha took third place.
 April 22 – 30: 2016 Women's African Club Championship in  Tunis
  Al Ahly SC defeated  Carthage, 3–2 in matches played, to win their second consecutive and seventh overall Women's African Club Championship title.
  Kenya Pipeline took third place.
 May 14 – 22: Women's World Olympic Qualification Tournament #1 in  Tokyo
 May 20 – 22: Women's World Olympic Qualification Tournament #2 in  San Juan, Puerto Rico
  has qualified to compete at Rio 2016.
 May 19 – 27: 2016 Men's Pan-American Volleyball Cup in  Mexico City
  defeated , 3–2 in matches played, to win their second Men's Pan-American Volleyball Cup title.  took third place.
 May 28 – June 5: Men's World Olympic Qualification Tournament #1 in  Tokyo
 June 3 – 5: Men's World Olympic Qualification Tournament #2 in  Mexico City
  qualified to compete at Rio 2016.
 June 24 – 29: 2016 Boys' Youth NORCECA Volleyball Championship in  Havana
  took the bronze medal.
 July 2 – 6: 19th Southeast Asian Junior Men’s Volleyball Championship 2016 in  Naypyidaw
 Round–robin group: 1. , 2. –A, 3. 
 July 2 – 10: 2016 Women's Pan-American Volleyball Cup in  Santo Domingo
 The  defeated , 3–2 in matches played, to win their fourth Women's Pan-American Volleyball Cup title.
 The  took the bronze medal.
 July 4 – 10: 2016 Men's Junior NORCECA Volleyball Championship in  Gatineau
 The  defeated , 3–1 in matches played, to win their third Men's Junior NORCECA Volleyball Championship title.
  took the bronze medal.
 July 9 – 17: 2016 Asian Junior Men's Volleyball Championship in  Kaohsiung
 The  defeated , 3–2 in matches played, to win their 4th Asian Junior Men's Volleyball Championship.
  took the bronze medal.
 July 16 – 20: 2016 Southeast Asian Women’s U19 Volleyball Championship in  Sisaket
  defeated , 3–1 in matches played, in the final.  took third place.
 July 23 – 31: 2016 Asian Junior Women's Volleyball Championship in  Nakhon Ratchasima
  defeated , 3–2 in matches played, in the final.  took third place.
 July 26 – August 1: 2016 Women's Junior NORCECA Volleyball Championship in  Fort Lauderdale, Florida
  took third place.
 August 23 – 31: 2016 Asian Men's Club Volleyball Championship in 
  Sarmayeh Bank Tehran VC defeated  Al Arabi, 3–1 in matches played, to win their first Asian Men's Club Volleyball Championship title. 
  Toyoda Gosei Trefuerza took third place.
  defeated , 3–0 in matches played, to win their second Women's U19 Volleyball European Championship title.
  took third place.
 September 2 – 10: 2016 Men's U20 Volleyball European Championship in 
  defeated , 3–1 in matches played, to win their second Men's U20 Volleyball European Championship title.
  took third place.
 September 3 – 11: 2016 Asian Women's Club Volleyball Championship in  Biñan
  NEC Red Rockets defeated  Ba'yi Shenzhen, 3–0 in matches played, to win their first Asian Women's Club Volleyball Championship title.
  Bangkok Glass took third place.
 September 14 – 20: 2016 Asian Women's Cup Volleyball Championship in  Vĩnh Phúc Province
  defeated , 3–0 in matches played, to win their second consecutive and fourth overall Asian Women's Cup Volleyball Championship title.
  took third place.
 September 22 – 28: 2016 Asian Men's Cup Volleyball Championship in  Nakhon Pathom
  defeated , 3–1 in matches played, to win their third AVC Cup for Men title.
  took third place.
 October 17 – 23: 2016 FIVB Volleyball Men's Club World Championship in  Betim
  Sada Cruzeiro defeated  Zenit Kazan, 3–0 in matches played, to win their second consecutive and third overall FIVB Volleyball Men's Club World Championship title.
  Trentino Diatec took third place.
 October 18 – 23: 2016 FIVB Volleyball Women's Club World Championship in   Pasay
  Eczacıbaşı VitrA defeated  Pomì Casalmaggiore, 3–2 in matches played, to win their second consecutive FIVB Volleyball Women's Club World Championship title.
  Vakıfbank İstanbul took third place.

2016 FIVB Volleyball World League
 July 1 – 3: Group 3 Finals in  Frankfurt
 Winners:  
 Second:  
 Third:  
 July 9 & 10: Group 2 Finals in  Matosinhos
 Winners: 
 Second: 
 Third: The 
 July 13 – 17: Group 1 Finals in  Kraków
 Winners: 
 Second: 
 Third:

2016 FIVB Volleyball World Grand Prix
 June 17 – 19: Group 3 Finals in  Almaty
 Winners: 
 Second: 
 Third: 
 June 17 – 19: Group 2 Finals in  Plovdiv
 Winners: 
 Second: 
 Third: 
 July 6 – 10: Group 1 Finals in  Bangkok
 Winners: 
 Second: The 
 Third: The

Volleyball Hall of Fame
Class of 2016: 
Emanuel Rego
Nikola Grbić
Misty May-Treanor
Danielle Scott-Arruda
Park Man-bok

References

 
 
Volleyball by year